Shraddha Sharma is an Indian singer from Dehradun, Uttarakhand who started out by uploading videos to YouTube. The first video was a cover of the song "Main Tenu Samjhawan ki" from the movie Virsa, uploaded when Sharma was 15, on 30 April 2011.

Sharma signed an album deal with Universal and a YouTube deal with Culture Machine.

Her album was launched at the inaugural YouTube Fan Fest on 1 March 2014 in Mumbai. Titled Raastey, the album is an eclectic mix of pop, R&B, rock and dance. Titled after the lead song "Raastey", the album, according to Sharma, is all about life and the road that lies ahead. All of the songs on the album were written by acclaimed songwriter Ankur Tewari.

After Sharma released her video "Dum Maro Dum", she planned to begin composing her next single.

Songs

References

External links

Singers from Kolkata
1995 births
Living people
Indian women singer-songwriters
21st-century Indian women singers
21st-century Indian singers